Skull Creek Township is one of seventeen townships in Butler County, Nebraska, United States. The population was 252 at the 2020 census. A 2021 estimate placed the township's population at 254.

The Village of Bruno lies within the Township.

See also
County government in Nebraska

References

External links
City-Data.com

Townships in Butler County, Nebraska
Townships in Nebraska